The LGV Rhin-Rhône (French: Ligne à Grande Vitesse; English: high-speed line) is a French high-speed rail line, the first in France to be presented as an inter-regional route rather than a link from the provinces to Paris, though it actually is used by some trains to/from Paris. The first phase of the eastern branch opened on 11 December 2011. Construction of its second phase was initially expected to start in 2014 but still has no funding.

If completed, LGV Rhin-Rhône would have three branches:
 The Eastern branch,  from Genlis, near Dijon to Lutterbach, near Mulhouse, of which  have been built
 The Western branch, crossing Dijon, joining the LGV Sud-Est near Montbard and making the line a connection between Dijon and Paris
 The Southern branch, from Dijon to Lyon
The construction of the latter two branches and of the second phase of the Eastern branch is currently unfunded.

Running north-south, the Southern branch line would help connect Germany, the north of Switzerland, and eastern France on the one hand with the valleys of the Saône, Rhône, the Mediterranean arc and finally Catalonia on the other. The east-west Eastern and Western branches lines would help connect on the one hand London, Brussels, Lille and Île-de-France (i.e., Paris and surroundings) with Burgundy, Franche-Comté, south Alsace, southern Baden, and Switzerland on the other.

A connection will be built at Perrigny, south of Dijon, to serve TGV and freight trains. Auxon station will be connected to Besançon-Viotte station by a railway line which could be also used for commuter trains.

It is projected that 12 million passengers per year will use the LGV Rhine-Rhône service.

Western branch
The western branch consists of the crossing of Dijon, where a new station is to be built, the connection to the Paris-Marseille line near Montbard and the connection with the LGV Sud-Est at the Pasilly-Aisy junction. This branch will speed up connections with the Île-de-France region.

Southern branch
Seven routes have been put up for discussion by the developer Réseau ferré de France, who favours a route parallel to the A 39 motorway, at an estimated cost of €3 billion.

History

The first phase of the eastern branch runs  of the  planned length, connecting Villers-les-Pots (east of Dijon) to Petit-Croix (southeast of Belfort), was officially opened by President Nicolas Sarkozy on 8 September 2011, with passenger services starting on 11 December 2011.

The eastern branch is used by TGV trains operated by SNCF. It will become a key link in both the north–south and east–west transport corridors. The line carries regional, national, and intra-European traffic. Mulhouse provides connection to Basel, Switzerland, and then to southwestern Germany and north-western Switzerland.

Finance 
The financing agreement for the first phase of the eastern branch was signed on 28 February 2006. The estimated cost of the first section of the eastern branch is 2.312 billion euros, shared between many organisations.

The largest contributors of funds are the Government of France (€751 million), the maintainer of the French rail network RFF (€642 million) and the European Union (€200 million). Significant funding also came from the three regions of France that the line travels through: Franche-Comté (€316 million), Alsace (€206 million) and Burgundy (€131 million). A further €66 million was funded by the Government of Switzerland.

Construction 

Preparatory works began in 2005, and construction officially started on 3 July 2006 with a ceremony in Les Magny, Haute-Saône. Actual construction of the first section started north of Besançon on 7 August 2006.

Réseau Ferré de France appointed French engineering and consulting companies Setec and Egis to build the line. The construction of the Eastern branch was divided into two sections :
This section opened for service on 11 December 2011.
 The second section, for which construction was initially planned to begin in 2014 but is not funded yet, would add  length to the line.

Journey times 
Upon completion of the first section of the eastern branch, best journey time are:

See also 
 High-speed rail
 TGV
 Intercity-Express

References

External links 
 Ligne à Grande Vitesse Rhin-Rhône
 Association Trans-Europe TGV Rhin-Rhône Méditerranée
 RFF
 Inter-regional TGV line will have an international impact Murray Hughes, Railway Gazette International

Rhin-Rhone
High-speed railway lines under construction
Proposed railway lines in France